Jerritt Kurt Elliott (born April 28, 1968) is an American volleyball head coach of the Texas Longhorns women's volleyball team since 2001.

Personal life
Elliott is a native of California and graduated from Palisades High School in Pacific Palisades, California, where he was a high school standout in volleyball. He was teammates with Olympic gold medalist Kent Steffes and led his high school team to an undefeated 36-0 record during his senior year. 

After high school, he played men's volleyball at both Pepperdine from 1986-1988 and Hawai'i from 1989-1990 before graduating from Cal State Northridge in 1991 with a degree in kinesiology.

Elliott married Andrea Nucete-Elliott in 2018. His first wife was Washington State University two-time All-American volleyball player Sarah Silvernail, whom he married in 2004.  He has two sons with her, Parker, born 2005, and Mack, born 2006, and a step-daughter, Kahle, born 1998.

Coaching
Prior to collegiate coaching, Elliott coached for high school and club volleyball teams. Additionally, he served as the director/head coach of the Westside Volleyball Club from 1992-95, where he led his 1994 squad to a fourth-place finish in the Nike Volleyball Festival. In 1992-93, Elliott assumed the role as head coach for the Forum Team Cup Volleyball.

Cal State Northridge (1993)
As an assistant coach on the men's volleyball team, Elliott helped the Matadors reach the NCAA national championship, where they fell to UCLA.

University of Southern California (1995—2000)

Elliott joined USC's coaching staff as an assistant coach under then-head coach Lisa Love.  As an assistant at USC, Elliott helped guide the Women of Troy to finish in the top 15 nationally all four years. He also was instrumental in developing two-time All-American middle blocker Jasmina Marinkovic (1995—98).

Elliott was named the interim head coach for the 1999 and 2000 season, as then-head coach Mick Haley took on the head coach position for the USA Women's National Team at the 2000 Sydney Olympics. As interim head coach, Elliot led the team to its first NCAA Final Four appearance in 15 seasons as well as a share of the Pac-10 volleyball title. The Trojans featured two All-Americans in 2000 (April Ross] and Jennifer Pahl) and six all-conference players, including the Pac-10 and Region Freshman of the Year (Ross). In both 2000 and 2001, Elliott’s recruiting class was regarded as No. 1 in the nation, the school’s first-ever No. 1 recruiting classes.

Texas (2001—present)

In April 2001, Elliott was appointed as Texas's new head volleyball coach. He quickly propelled Texas back into national prominence. Since he began in 2001, he has made every NCAA Tournament except one, has reached the Final Four six times, and won the national championship twice, in 2012 and 2022.

In the 2021 season, Elliott guided Texas to its fifth-consecutive and 14th overall Big 12 Championship. The Longhorns have won or shared ten of the last 11 league championships and 13 of the previous 15. He won his 8th Big 12 Coach of the Year award in 2021.

In the 2022 season, Elliott led Texas to the program's fourth national championship, going 28–1 on the season en route to winning its sixth straight Big 12 title. He was named Big 12 Coach of the Year while the team also had the league's player, setter, and libero of the year award winners. Texas senior Logan Eggleston was named the AVCA National Player of the Year, marking the first time in program history a Texas player won the award, and six players were named All-Americans.

Head coaching record

References

1968 births
Living people
Texas Longhorns women's volleyball coaches
American volleyball coaches
Pepperdine Waves men's volleyball players
Hawaii Rainbow Warriors volleyball players
Cal State Northridge Matadors men's volleyball players
USC Trojans women's volleyball coaches
Cal State Northridge Matadors coaches
People from Pacific Palisades, California